Paint-on-glass animation is a technique for making animated films by manipulating slow-drying oil paints on sheets of glass. Gouache mixed with glycerine is sometimes used instead. The best-known practitioner of the technique is Russian animator Aleksandr Petrov; he has used it in seven films, all of which have won awards.

Animators/films
Agamurad Amanov (Агамурад Аманов)
Tuzik (Тузик) (2001)
Childhood's Autumn, Осень детства (Osen detstva) (2005) (with Yekatirina Boykova)
Martine Chartrand
Black Soul (2000)
Witold Giersz
Little Western (Mały Western) (1960)
Red and Black (Czerwone i czarne) (1963)
Horse (Koń) (1967)
The Stuntman (Kaskader) (1972)
Fire (Pożar) (1975)
Aleksey Karayev (Алексей Караев)
Welcome, Добро пожаловать (Dobro pozhalovat) (1986)
The Lodgers of an Old House, Жильцы старого дома (Zhiltsy starovo doma) (1987)
I Can Hear You, Я вас слышу (Ya vas slyshu) (1992)
Caroline Leaf
The Street (1976)
Marcos Magalhães
Animando (1987) (partially; instructive film)
Miyo Sato
Fox Fears (2016)
Mob Psycho 100 (2016, 2018)
Natalya Orlova (Наталья Орлова)
Hamlet (1992)
King Richard III (1994)
Moby Dick, Моби Дик (1999)
Aleksandr Petrov (Александр Петров) (was art director on Karayev's Welcome in 1986)
The Cow, Корова (Korova) (1989)
The Dream of a Ridiculous Man, Сон смешного человека (Son smeshnovo cheloveka) (1992)
The Mermaid, Русалка (Rusalka) (1997)
The Old Man and the Sea (1999)
Winter Days, 冬の日 (Fuyu no hi) (2003) (segment)
My Love, Моя любовь (Moya lyubov) (2006)
Georges Schwizgebel
The Man With No Shadow, (L'homme sans ombre) (2004)
Retouches, (Retouches) (2008)
Vladimir Samsonov
The Winter, Зима (Zima) (1979)
Brightness, Блики (Bliki) (1981)
Contrasts, Контрасты (Kontrasty) (1981)
Contours, Контуры (Kontury) (1981)
Masquerade, Маскарад (Maskarad) (1981)
Still Life, Натюрморт (Natyurmort) (1981)
Restoration, Реставрация (Restavratsiya) (1981)
The Little Sun, Солнышко (Solnyshko) (1981)
The Snail, Улитка (Ulitka) (1981)
Magic Trick, Фокус (Fokus) (1981)
Coloured Music, Цветомузыка (Tsvetomuzyka) (1981)
The Bumblebee, Шмель (Shmel) (1981)
Mood, Настроение (Nastroyeniye) (1982)
The Landscape, Пейзаж (Peyzazh) (1982)
Rendez-Vous, Свидание (Svidaniye) (1982)
The Magpie, Сорока (Soroka) (1982)
The Motif, Мотив (Motiv) (1984)
Waiting for..., Ожидание (Ozhidaniye) (1984)
Miniatures, Миниатюры (Miniatyury) (1985)
Miniatures - 86, Миниатюры - 86 (Miniatyury - 86) (1986)
Olive Jar Studios
MTV: Greetings From The World (1988)
Boris Stepantsev
The Song About the Falcon, Песня о соколе (Pesnya o sokole) (1967)
Wendy Tilby
Strings (1991)

See also
Animation techniques
Painting

References

External links
Comments and tips from paint-on-glass animators
Animation in the Post-Industrial Era (mentions many of the above animators)
 Pascal Blais Studio - includes clips of Petrov's animations (enter the English site, then click on "directors")

Animation techniques
Glass art